Rodriquez Jacquees Broadnax (born April 15, 1994), known mononymously as Jacquees (pronounced jah-kweese), is an American singer, songwriter, and rapper from Decatur, Georgia. In 2015, he signed a recording and management contract with Cash Money Records. His 2016 single, "B.E.D.", was on the Billboard Hot 100 chart for seven weeks, peaking at number 69. His debut album, 4275, was released on June 15, 2018. The album was followed up by King of R&B in 2019, and Sincerely For You in 2022.

Career 
In 2007, Jacquees met his first manager, Corey Battle. He performed in a variety of talent shows before he met and switched management to Russell "Block" Spencer, who was CEO and founder of Block Entertainment. Jacquees worked in various recording studios as part of a production team. Block's focus was only rap music, not R&B. Jacquees later began working closely at Block's recording studio, gaining exposure with the track, "Krazy", featuring Atlanta rapper T.I.

On March 25, 2014, Jacquees independently released his second EP, 19, which debuted at number 15 on the US Billboard Top R&B Albums. The 11-track EP features guest appearances from Chris Brown, Rich Homie Quan, Lloyd, and Trinidad James. On October 1, 2014, Jacquees announced that he had signed a recording deal with Cash Money Records. In May 2016, he collaborated with label-mate Birdman on an EP titled Lost at Sea. He found mainstream success with his 2016 single "B.E.D.", charting at number 69 on the Billboard Hot 100.

In November 2019, he released his second studio album King of R&B. The album debuted at number 20 on the Billboard 200. Pitchfork stated that Jacquees appeared "well-rounded" on the album, and his vocals paired well with his collaborators. Jacquees embarked on the King of R&B Tour in early 2020 in support of the album.

Discography

Studio albums

Extended plays

Mixtapes

Singles

As lead artist

As featured artist

Awards and nominations

Notes

References 

Living people
1994 births
21st-century African-American male singers
African-American male singer-songwriters
American hip hop singers
American contemporary R&B singers
Cash Money Records artists
Singer-songwriters from Georgia (U.S. state)